The Kings Cross Tunnel is a twin-tube road tunnel in Sydney, Australia. It runs beneath Kings Cross from William Street to New South Head Road. It was built in conjunction with the Eastern Suburbs railway line that has a tunnel immediately below the road tunnel at its eastern end.

Work commenced in 1970. Two bridges were constructed at Victoria Street and Ward Avenue forming the portals. A foot bridge was built near the eastern approach. Built using the cut and cover method, it was opened on 15 December 1975 by Premier Tom Lewis. The air rights were sold in the 1980s and reveloped as apartments by Walker Corporation.

References

Kings Cross, New South Wales
Road tunnels in Australia
Tunnels in Sydney
Tunnels completed in 1975
1975 establishments in Australia